Aleksandr Aleksandrovich Manukovsky (born 11 July 1985) is a Russian former professional football player.

Club career
He made his Russian Football National League debut for FC Khimik Dzerzhinsk on 13 July 2013 in a game against FC Baltika Kaliningrad.

External links
 
 

1985 births
Sportspeople from Voronezh
Living people
Russian footballers
Association football midfielders
FC Dynamo Moscow reserves players
FC Yenisey Krasnoyarsk players
FC Sokol Saratov players
FC Fakel Voronezh players
FC Khimik Dzerzhinsk players
FC Volgar Astrakhan players
FC Akzhayik players
Russian expatriate footballers
Expatriate footballers in Kazakhstan